The Hungarian Revolution Memorial (also known as Hungarian Monument) is a monument and sculpture by E. Gyuri Hollosy, installed in Boston's Liberty Square Park, in the U.S. state of Massachusetts. It commemorates the thirtieth anniversary of the Hungarian Revolution of 1956.

Description
The memorial depicts a nude woman holding her baby, a fallen Hungarian soldier, and multiple heads representing the students who died during the revolution. The bronze sculpture over a stainless steel armature is approximately 16 ft., 4 in. tall. It rests on a granite base that is approximately 30 in. tall, with a diameter of 8 ft.

History
The monument was commissioned by the Hungarian Society of Massachusetts to commemorate the thirtieth anniversary of the Hungarian Revolution of 1956. It was originally dedicated on October 23, 1986, but was dismantled during November 15–16, 1986, and stored until May 1989. The work was rededicated after Liberty Square Park's plaza opened. It was surveyed by the Smithsonian Institution's "Save Outdoor Sculpture!" program in 1993.

References

External links

 Hungarian Revolution, 1986, cultureNOW
 Hungarian Society of Massachusetts Commemorates 1956, Hungary Initiatives Foundation
 Hungarian Revolution Memorial – Boston, MA at Waymarking

1980s establishments in Massachusetts
1980s sculptures
Bronze sculptures in Massachusetts
Granite sculptures in Massachusetts
Hungarian Revolution of 1956
Monuments and memorials in Boston
Nude sculptures in the United States
Outdoor sculptures in Boston
Sculptures of children in the United States
Sculptures of men in Massachusetts
Sculptures of women in Massachusetts
Stainless steel sculptures in the United States
Statues in Boston
Steel sculptures in Massachusetts